The 1988 Los Angeles Raiders season was the franchise's 29th season overall, and the franchise's 19th season in the National Football League.  Mike Shanahan was hired as head coach, and the club finished with a 7–9 record. The Raiders drafted Heisman Trophy winner Tim Brown, making Brown the third person on the Raiders roster to have won the Heisman Trophy, the others being Marcus Allen and Bo Jackson. Most of the team's success throughout the season came through their division, as the Raiders finished 6-2 against the weak AFC West division, with their only 2 losses against the champions of the division, the Seattle Seahawks. However, the Raiders were only 1-7 against the rest of the NFL, with their only other win coming against the eventual champions, the 49ers in San Francisco in a game in which only field goals were kicked.

Offseason

NFL Draft

Personnel

Staff

Roster

Regular season

Schedule

Season summary

Week 1

Week 2

Week 3
Steve Beuerlein threw for 375 yards in a game against the Los Angeles Rams.

Week 4

Week 7

    
    
    
    
    
    
    

Bo Jackson 70 Yds (season debut; reported to Raiders Wednesday)
The Raiders played without DE Howie Long, S Stacey Toran and TE Todd Christensen due to injuries while Marcus Allen was limited due to a wrist injury of his own.

Standings

Awards and records
Tim Brown, Pro Bowl selection
Tim Brown, led all AFC rookies in receiving yardage
Tim Brown, led NFL with 26.8 yard average on kickoff return
Tim Brown had more total yards rushing, receiving and returning kicks (2,317) than any other rookie in NFL history.

References

 Raiders on Pro Football Reference
 Raiders on jt-sw.com
 Raiders stats on jt-sw.com

Los Angeles Raiders
1988
Los